Emily Robinson (born 6 February 1993) is an Australian rugby union player. She made her international debut for Australia in 2016. She plays for the NSW Waratahs in the Super W competition.

Robinson was selected to represent Australia at the 2017 Rugby World Cup in Ireland. In 2022, She was named in the Wallaroos squad for a two-test series against the Black Ferns at the Laurie O'Reilly Cup.

Robinson was selected in the Wallaroos side again for the delayed 2022 Rugby World Cup in New Zealand.

References

External links
Wallaroos Profile

1993 births
Living people
Australia women's international rugby union players
Australian female rugby union players